The VinFast VF 5 is an electric subcompact crossover SUV that will be produced and marketed by VinFast from 2023. On January 6, 2022, the model was presented for the first time at the Consumer Electronics Show, and was shown in full at the 2022 Paris Motor Show.

Overview
The VF5 is an A-segment crossover city car forming the entry to the VinFast line-up. It was earlier known as the VinFast VF e32.

References

External link 
 VinFast VF 5 Plus - VinFast

Cars introduced in 2022
Crossover sport utility vehicles
Production electric cars
VF 5
Battery electric vehicles